Planckendael is a zoo, located on the grounds of Planckendael castle in the village district of Muizen, in Mechelen, Belgium. In 1956 the Royal Zoological Society of Antwerp (KMDA) bought the Planckendael estate in order to acquire a larger space for animals than what they owned: the city zoo in Antwerp. Planckendael hosts exotic animals like rhinos, bison and various antelope species.

Planckendael also has extensive leisure facilities: For children there is a large separate play area.

References
Much of the content of this article comes from the equivalent Dutch-language wikipedia article.  Retrieved on 10 December 2014.

External links

Gallery

1956 establishments in Belgium
Zoos in Belgium
Buildings and structures in Mechelen